Makita Ka Lang Muli (International title: Just to See You Again) is a Philippine television drama series broadcast by GMA Network. It stars Roderick Paulate, Oyo Boy Sotto and Carlo Aquino. It premiered on November 6, 2006 on the network's Dramarama sa Hapon line up replacing Pinakamamahal. The series concluded on February 16, 2007 with a total of 75 episodes. It was replaced by Muli in its timeslot.

Cast and characters

Lead cast
 Roderick Paulate as Valetin Barba / Vicar Barbarosa
 Oyo Boy Sotto as Roy
 Carlo Aquino as Leo

Supporting cast
 Celia Rodriguez as Olmypia Van Helden
 LJ Reyes as Vianne
 JC de Vera as Matthew
 Ana Roces
 Andrea del Rosario as Sofia
 Cris Villanueva
 Sugar Mercado as Andeng
 Janette McBride as Cali
 Dion Ignacio
 Tanya Garcia as young Olmypia

Accolades

References

External links
 

2006 Philippine television series debuts
2007 Philippine television series endings
Filipino-language television shows
GMA Network drama series
Television series by TAPE Inc.
Television shows set in the Philippines